PC-1 (Pacific Crossing 1) is a submarine telecommunications cable system in the North Pacific Ocean linking the United States to Japan.

It has landing points in:
Shima, Mie Prefecture, Japan
Ajigaura, Hitachinaka, Ibaraki Prefecture, Japan
Harbour Pointe, Snohomish County, Washington, United States
Grover Beach, San Luis Obispo County, California, United States

It has a design transmission capacity of 640 Gbit/s, with 180 Gbit/s lit (as of February 2006), and a total cable length of 20,890 km.  It started operation in January 2001.

Since 2009, PC-1 has been owned by Japanese carrier NTT.

References
 

 

Submarine communications cables in the Pacific Ocean
Japan–United States relations
Communications in Washington (state)
Communications in California
2001 establishments in California
2001 establishments in Japan
2001 establishments in Oregon